Bothayna El Essa (Arabic: بثينة العيسى) is a novelist from Kuwait who was born on 3 September 1982.

Career 
Bothayna is a member of the Kuwaiti Writers Association as well as the Arab Internet Writers Union. She won the State Encouragement Award for her novel Saear, which was released in 2005. She also won the first place in the Youth and Sports Authority competition in 2003 - the short story section. She ranked third in the Sheikha Basimah Al-Sabah competition - the short story section. In addition, in 2006 she ranked the third place Al-Sada magazine competition for creative people in 2006. She is also an owner of a publishing house, bookseller and participating in a creative writing platform.

El Essa has also campaigned against censorship in Kuwait.

Works 
El Essa's works include “Struck .. No sound was heard”, “Saear”, “Bride of the Rain,” “Under Mothers' Feet,” “Qais, Layla and the Wolf”, “Aisha Descends to the Underworld”, and "everything."

References 

Kuwaiti novelists
1982 births
Living people